Hordern is a surname. Notable people with the surname include:

Anthony Hordern & Sons, department store in Sydney, Australia
Edward Hordern (1941–2000), world's leading authority on sliding block puzzles
Hugh Maudslay Hordern (born 1868), sixth Bishop of Lewes
Michael Hordern (1911–1995), English actor, knighted in 1983
Percy Hordern (1864–1926), Australian businessman and politician
Peter Hordern (born 1929), British Conservative Party politician
Ranji Hordern (1883–1938), Australian cricketer
Samuel Hordern (1876–1956), Australian businessman

See also
Cape Hordern, ice-free cape at the northwest end of the Bunger Hills in Antarctica
Hordern family influential mercantile dynasty in Australia
Hordern Pavilion, building in Moore Park, Sydney, New South Wales, Australia, on the grounds of the old Sydney Showground
Hordern-Richmond, manufacturer and dealer in aircraft and aeronautical equipment
Hordern-Richmond Autoplane, 1930s British twin-engined two-seat cabin touring monoplane designed by Edmund Hordern